Iván Jared Moreno Füguemann (born 17 January 1998) is a Mexican professional footballer who plays as a winger for Liga MX club León, on loan from Puebla.

Career statistics

Club

References

External links
 
 
 

Living people
1998 births
Association football midfielders
Atlético Zacatepec footballers
Club América footballers
Liga MX players
Mazatlán F.C. footballers
Footballers from Puebla
People from Puebla (city)
Mexican footballers